Royal Air Force Merston or more simply RAF Merston is a former Royal Air Force satellite station located in West Sussex, England.

History 
RAF Merston was built In May 1941, as a grass airfield satellite to the neighbouring RAF Tangmere. The site was used by RAF fighter squadrons from May 1941 to August 1942. The site briefly closed for redevelopment in from August 1942 until its reopening in May 1943 as an RAF fighter station. It was used by the Royal Navy as a storage site for surplus war equipment until it closed on 13 November 1945.

Units

The following squadrons were here at some point:

Units;

References

Citations

Bibliography

Merston